Jordanów Śląski is a village in Wrocław County, Lower Silesian Voivodeship, in south-western Poland. It is the seat of the administrative district (gmina) called Gmina Jordanów Śląski.

The village has a population of 1,148.

References

Villages in Wrocław County